D. O. Lee Peak, also known as Lee Peak, at  above sea level, is the third-highest peak in the White Cloud Mountains of the U.S. state of Idaho. It is one of the White Cloud Peaks and the 56th-highest peak in Idaho. It was named after Challis native David Oliver Lee (1934–1982), the first United States Forest Service ranger to be assigned to the Sawtooth Wilderness.

See also
Castle Peak (Idaho)
Baker Lake
Blackmon Peak
Born Lakes
Chamberlain Basin

References

External links

Mountains of Custer County, Idaho
Mountains of Idaho
Sawtooth National Forest